203rd Division may refer to:

 203rd Rifle Division
 203rd Security Division

Military units and formations disambiguation pages